Coatbridge West is one of the twenty-one wards used to elect members of the North Lanarkshire Council. Covering neighbourhoods in the south-west of Coatbridge (Barrowfield, Dundyvan, Kirkwood, Langloan, Old Monkland) and the separate village of Bargeddie, it elects three councillors. A boundary review in 2017 caused the loss of an area between Langloan Street, the A725 and the A89, with a small decrease in the electorate but no change in the number of seats. The ward had a population of 14,910 in 2019.

Councillors

Election Results

2022 Election

2017 Election

2012 Election

 

Labour Party councillor Tom Maginnis died on 29 November 2012. A by-election was held on 28 February 2013 and the seat was retained by Labour's Kevin Docherty.
On 8 March 2016, Labour councillor Jim Smith resigned from the party and became Independents.

2013 by-election

2007 Election

References

Wards of North Lanarkshire
Coatbridge